Miguel Ángel Vivas (born 1974) is a Spanish director, and screenwriter.

He has directed films such as Extinction (2015), and Your Son (2018).

Filmography

As director
 Asedio (2023)
 Desaparecidos (2020)
 Unauthorized Living (2018)
 Tu hijo (2018)
 Apaches (2017)
 Money Heist (2017)
 Mar de plástico (2016)
 Inside (2016)
 Extinction (2015)
 Cuéntame un cuento (2013)
 The Room (2011)
 Secuestrados (2010)
 I'll See You in My Dreams (2003)
 El hombre del saco (2002)
 Reflejos (2002)
 Tesoro (1999)

As actor
 La noche después de que mi novia me dejara (TBA)

References

External links

 
 

1974 births
Film directors from Andalusia
Spanish screenwriters
People from Seville
Spanish television directors
Living people